Grabski (feminine: Grabska; plural: Grabscy) may refer to:

 Andrzej Feliks Grabski (1934–2000), Polish historian
 Józef Grabski (born 1950), Polish art historian
 Małgorzata Kidawa-Błońska, née Grabska (born 1957), Polish politician
 Stanisław Grabski (1871–1949), Polish economist and politician
 Władysław Grabski (1874–1938), Polish economist and Prime Minister
 Władysław Jan Grabski (1901–1970), Polish writer
 Zofia Kirkor-Kiedroniowa, née Grabska (1872–1952), Polish activist
 Zofia Wojciechowska-Grabska (1905–1992), Polish painter

See also
 
 

Polish-language surnames